The 2006 FIVB Women's World Championship was the fifteenth edition of the competition, contested by the senior women's national teams of the members of the  (FIVB), the sport's global governing body. The final tournament was held from 31 October to 16 November 2006 in Japan.

The finals involved 24 teams, of which 22 came through qualifying competitions, while the host nation and reign champion qualified automatically. Of the 32 teams, 16 had also appeared in the previous tournament in 2002, while Cameroon, Costa Rica, Kazakhstan, Turkey and Serbia and Montenegro made their first appearances at a FIVB Volleyball Women's World Championship.

Russia won their sixth world title, defeating Brazil in five sets at the final. Serbia and Montenegro won the 3rd place match, defeating Italy in straight sets Yoshie Takeshita from Japan was elected the MVP.

Qualification

Source:FIVB

Squads

Venues

Source:

Format
The tournament was played in three different stages (first, second and final rounds). A single round-robin format was played within each group to determine the teams group position, the four best teams of each group (total of 16 teams) progressed to the next round.

The six best teams of each group (total of 12 teams) progressed to the next round.

First and second of each group played the semifinals, third and fourth played the 5th-8th semifinals and fifth and sixth played the 9th-12th semifinals. Winners and losers of each semifinals played a final placement match for 1st to 12th places.

Source:FIVB

Pools composition
The drawing of lots for the qualified teams took place in Tokyo, Japan on 29 November 2005.

Results
All times are Japan Standard Time (UTC+09:00).

First round

Pool A
Venue: Yoyogi National Gymnasium, Tokyo

|}

|}

Pool B
Venue: Hokkaido Prefectural Sports Center, Sapporo

|}

|}

Pool C
Venue: Kobe Green Arena, Kobe

|}

|}

Pool D
Venue: Nagoya Rainbow Hall, Nagoya

|}

|}

Second round
The results and the points of the matches between the same teams that were already played during the first round are taken into account for the second round.

Pool E
Venue: Nagoya Rainbow Hall, Nagoya

|}

|}

Pool F
Venue: Osaka Municipal Central Gymnasium, Osaka

|}

|}

Final round

9th–12th place
Venue: Osaka Prefectural Gymnasium, Osaka

9th–12th semifinals

|}

11th place match

|}

9th place match

|}

5th–8th place
Venues: Osaka Municipal Central Gymnasium (OMCG) and Osaka Prefectural Gymnasium (OPG), both in Osaka

5th–8th semifinals

|}

7th place match

|}

5th place match

|}

Finals
Venue: Osaka Municipal Central Gymnasium, Osaka

Semifinals

|}

3rd place match

|}

Final

|}

Final standing

Awards

 Most Valuable Player
  Yoshie Takeshita
 Best Scorer
  Neslihan Darnel
 Best Spiker
  Rosir Calderón
 Best Blocker
  Christiane Fürst
 Best Server
  Yelena Godina

 Best Digger
  Szu Hui-Fang
 Best Receiver
  Jaqueline Carvalho
 Best Setter
  Yoshie Takeshita
 Best Libero
  Suzana Ćebić

Statistics leaders
The statistics of each group follows the vis reports P2 and P3. The statistics include 6 volleyball skills; serve, reception, set, spike, block, and dig. The table below shows the top 5 ranked players in each skill plus top scorers as of 16 November 2006.

Best Scorers
Best scorers determined by scored points from attack, block, and serve.

Best Spikers
Best attackers determined by successful attacks in percentage.

Best Blockers
Best blockers determined by the average of stuff blocks per set.

Best Servers
Best servers determined by the average of aces per set.

Best Setters
Best setters determined by the average of running sets per set.

Best Diggers
Best diggers determined by the average of successful digs per set.

Best Receivers
Best receivers determined by efficient receptions in percentage.

See also

 2006 FIVB Men's World Championship

References

External links
 Official website
 Federation Internationale de Volleyball

 
FIVB Volleyball Women's World Championship
FIVB Women's World Championship
Voll
V
Women's volleyball in Japan
October 2006 sports events in Asia
November 2006 sports events in Asia
Sports competitions in Osaka
21st century in Osaka
Sports competitions in Tokyo
FIVB Volleyball Women's World Championship
21st century in Sapporo
Sports competitions in Sapporo
Sports competitions in Nagoya
Sports competitions in Kobe